Magongo may refer to:

Magongo, Nigeria, in Ogori/Magongo Local Government Area
Magongo, Kenya, a suburb of Mombasa